The 1976 United States Senate election in Nebraska took place on November 2, 1976. Incumbent Republican senator Roman Hruska decided to retire instead of seeking another term. Democrat Edward Zorinsky won the open seat.

Democratic primary

Candidates
Hess Dyas, Democratic candidate for Nebraska's 1st district in 1974
Edward Zorinsky, mayor of Omaha

Results

Republican primary

Candidates
John Y. McCollister, Representative for Nebraska's 2nd district
Richard Proud, State Senator

Results

Results

See also 
 1976 United States Senate elections

References

Nebraska
1976
1976 Nebraska elections